Biretwo is a settlement in Kenya's Rift Valley Province.

Ethnicity 
The people of the Rift Valley are a mesh work of different tribal identities, and the Kalenjin and the Maasai are two of the best known ethnic groups.  Most of Kenya's top runners comes from the Kalenjin community.  The Maasai people have the most recognizable cultural identity, both nationally and internationally, and serve as Kenya's international cultural symbol.

See also 
 Kerio River
 Zeitz Foundation

References 

Populated places in Rift Valley Province